Arabella Field (born February 5, 1965) is an American actress and film producer known for her roles in films such as Dante's Peak, Feeling Minnesota, Godzilla, National Treasure, Paper Man and as Melinda Bitterman in the animated television version of Rick Kirkman and Jerry Scott's daily comic strip Baby Blues.

Career 
She has guest starred in a number of notable television series, including The Sopranos, Seinfeld, Law & Order, Numb3rs, House, Rules of Engagement, In Case of Emergency and other shows. She had a recurring role playing Patsi Moosekian in the show Under Suspicion.

In 2010, Field starred in the web series Sex and the Austen Girl on Babelgum, produced and directed by her husband, Brian Gerber. Field and Gerber had two children together before his death, by suicide, in 2012.

Filmography

Film

Television

References

External links

1965 births
American film actresses
American television actresses
Living people
Actresses from New York City
21st-century American women